Senator Graham may refer to:

Members of the United States Senate
 Lindsey Graham (born 1955), U.S. Senator from South Carolina
 Bob Graham (born 1936), U.S. Senator from Florida from 1987 to 2005
 Frank Porter Graham (1886–1972), U.S. Senator from North Carolina from 1949 to 1950
 William Alexander Graham (1804–1875), U.S. Senator from North Carolina from 1840 to 1843, and Confederate States Senator from 1864 to 1865

United States state senate members
Chuck Graham (born 1965), Missouri State Senate
Clifford Graham (fl. 2010s), Senate of the U.S. Virgin Islands
Ernest R. Graham (politician) (1886–1957), Florida State Senate
Hiram P. Graham (1820–1902), Wisconsin State Senate
James H. Graham (1812–1881), New York State Senate
John A. Graham (1911-1979), Illinois State Senate
Malcolm D. Graham (1827–1878), Texas State Senate
Malcolm Graham (politician) (born 1963), North Carolina State Senate
Philip A. Graham (1910–1993), Massachusetts Senate from
Richey V. Graham (1886–1972), Illinois State Senate
William A. Graham (agriculture commissioner) (1839–1923), North Carolina State Senate
William M. Graham (politician) (1819–1886), New York State Senate

See also
Phil Gramm (born 1942), U.S. Senator from Texas from 1985 to 2002